The following is a list of  the disambiguation of the Federal Constitution of the United Mexican States
 Federal Constitution of the United Mexican States of 1824 
 Federal Constitution of the United Mexican States of 1857 
 Federal Constitution of the United Mexican States of 1917

See also 

 Constitution of Mexico
 Federal Constitution (disambiguation)